Gary S. Scott is an American film composer who has contributed music to over forty movies, TV shows, and television movies, beginning with the 1981 horror movie Final Exam. He has also worked a record producer, an arranger, musical director, and conductor. He has received five BMI Cable Awards for his work on The Suite Life of Zack & Cody, The Suite Life on Deck, and Beverly Hills 90210.

Personal life 
Scott was born in Los Angeles, California. He is a UCLA graduate, where he earned a degree in music from the College of Fine Arts.

Partial filmography

References 

American film score composers
American male film score composers
Living people
UCLA School of the Arts and Architecture alumni
Year of birth missing (living people)